is a Japanese professional footballer who plays as a winger for FC Utrecht.

Career
Naoki Maeda joined to J2 League club; Tokyo Verdy in 2012. In 2015, he moved to J1 League club; Matsumoto Yamaga. In 2016, he moved to Yokohama F. Marinos before rejoining Matsumoto in 2018. In January 2022 he was loaned to FC Utrecht of the Dutch Eredivisie on a six-month loan spell. He made his debut on 16 January 2022 in a match against AFC Ajax starting on his debut and playing for 11 minutes before being forced off due to a broken leg following a tackle from Ajax’s Lisandro Martínez. It was announced on 31 August 2022 that Utrecht signed Maeda on loan again for the 2022–23 season.

Career statistics

Honours
Nagoya Grampus
J.League Cup: 2021

References

External links
Profile at Matsumoto Yamaga 
Profile at Yokohama F. Marinos 

1994 births
Living people
Association football people from Saitama Prefecture
Japanese footballers
J1 League players
J2 League players
J3 League players
Eredivisie players
Tokyo Verdy players
Matsumoto Yamaga FC players
Yokohama F. Marinos players
Nagoya Grampus players
FC Utrecht players
J.League U-22 Selection players
Association football midfielders
Sportspeople from Saitama (city)
Japanese expatriate footballers
Japanese expatriate sportspeople in the Netherlands
Expatriate footballers in the Netherlands